James Herbert "Jimmy" Sears (March 20, 1931January 4, 2002) was a professional American football defensive back/halfback in the National Football League (NFL) and the American Football League (AFL).

High school career
Sears prepped at Inglewood High School in Inglewood, California, where he was student body president in spring 1949.

College career
Sears played college football at the University of Southern California.  He was seventh in the Heisman Trophy voting his senior year. In 1952, he became the second person to receive the W.J. Voit Memorial Trophy as the outstanding football player on the Pacific Coast.  Before playing for the USC Trojans, Sears played at El Camino Junior College in Torrance, California.

Professional career
Sears played for the NFL's Chicago Cardinals (1954, 1957–1958), and the AFL's Los Angeles Chargers (1960) and Denver Broncos (1961).

Coaching career
Sears was an assistant coach for USC during the 1959 season.

See also
Other American Football League players
 1952 College Football All-America Team

References

External links

1931 births
2002 deaths
Inglewood High School (California) alumni
Players of American football from Los Angeles
American football defensive backs
American football halfbacks
USC Trojans football players
All-American college football players
Chicago Cardinals players
Los Angeles Chargers players
Denver Broncos (AFL) players